Vayyattupuzha is a village situated near to Chittar in Pathanamthitta district, Kerala. It is predominantly a rural hilly area but is very famous for spice trade.

See also
 Nilakkal
 Uthimoodu
 Chittar
 Seethathodu
 Angamoozhy
 Pathanamthitta

References 

Villages in Pathanamthitta district